The act of assigning study buddies for international students, practiced by Shandong University, has spurred extensive controversy across Chinese media.

As of 2016, Shandong University has announced a study buddy program for international students. According to the announcement, the international students office would assign a Chinese study buddy for the international student. The Chinese study buddy is encouraged to engage in development of language skills as well as general activities with the international student.

In 2018, the buddy program got an upgrade. One international student could have up to three Chinese study buddies. For those who applied to the buddy program, 141 of them were Chinese (mostly female), 47 of them were international.

In July 2019, the Chinese media was flooded by a document of the buddy program, and vast resentment has grown against the university's practice. Rumors include that, each international student could be assigned three Chinese girl friends, and many false accuse against female students in Shandong University.

The response of the international affairs department of Shandong University immediately provided an explanation of the buddy program, indicating that the buddy program is legal and valid, the application of buddy program completely comes from volunteers, so that no student was forced to become buddy for international students. The buddy program was not special to Shandong University either, many other universities, including Nanjing University, Jilin University also have their buddy programs. The explanation received a harsh response by the media.

Later in mid of July, the official Sina Weibo of Shandong University made an apology, which mentioned "improper options" in the application forms of buddy program, specifically, an option to "develop romantic relationships". The apology denied the existence of assigning female Chinese buddies to international male students. Shandong University also promised to make adjustments to the program.

Aftermath 
International students in China have been granted disproportinate benefits for a long time, especially in terms of scholarships and stipends compared to fellow Chinese students. Therefore the incident has sparked vast resentment among Chinese media. The incident, combined with another incident that involved assault of police by an international student in Fuzhou, China, has brought the issue of foreign students under spotlight.

In 2019, during an on campus recruitment event, a speaker from Wanda made an improper comment that "the girls of Shandong University are beautiful, I indeed believe the foreign students are enjoying their lives here" which received criticism.

See also 
 Nanjing anti-African protests

References 

Universities and colleges in China
Racism in China
Xenophobia in Asia